Bernardine is a 1957 American musical film directed by Henry Levin and starring Pat Boone, Terry Moore, Dean Jagger, Dick Sargent, and (in her last film, after a 19-year hiatus) Janet Gaynor. The 1952 play upon which the movie is based was written by Mary Coyle Chase, the Denver playwright who also wrote the popular 1944 Broadway play Harvey. The title song, with words and music by Johnny Mercer, became a hit record for Boone.

Plot
At Wingate High School, a group of pals including Griner (Ronnie Burns), Arthur "Beau" Beaumont (Pat Boone) and Sanford "Fofo Bidnut" Wilson (Dick Sargent) race cars and boats, hang out at an after-school place called the "Shamrock Club", and jokingly profess their love for a mythical dream girl named Bernardine Mudd from Sneaky Falls, Idaho.

Sanford, who's academically and socially less successful than his pals, declares that he intends to take a date to see bongo king Jack Costanzo perform at the Black Cat Club. When the boys call the local phone company for the fictional Bernardine's phone number, a young operator named Jean (Terry Moore) answers the phone. Soon she accepts a date with Sanford.

The love-struck Sanford feels that he has found his "Bernardine". But when his widowed mother (Janet Gaynor) talks about remarrying, and he realizes he could flunk out of school rather than graduate, he decides to briefly put his new romance on the back burner. His friends try to help him with his problems, but their well-meaning attempts don't go as planned.

Cast

 Pat Boone as Arthur "Beau" Beaumont 
 Terry Moore as Jean Cantrick 
 Janet Gaynor as Mrs. Ruth Wilson 
 Dean Jagger as J. Fullerton Weldy 
 Dick Sargent as Sanford Wilson (credited as Richard Sargent) 
 James Drury as Lt. Langley Beaumont 
 Ronnie Burns as Griner 
 Walter Abel as Mr. Beaumont 
 Natalie Schafer as Mrs. Madge Beaumont 
 Isabel Jewell as Mrs. McDuff
 Edith Angold as Hilda  
 Val Benedict as Morgan Friedelhauser  
 Emestine Wade as Cleo  
 Russ Conway as Mr. Mason  
 Thomas Pittman as George Olson  
 Jack Costanzo as himself - Orchestra leader
 Hooper Dunbar as Vernon Kinswood

Production
Buddy Adler of 20th Century Fox bought the film rights in 1955 as a vehicle for Robert Wagner. The film, however, was reworked as a vehicle for Pat Boone. In 1956 Boone was one of the biggest music artists in the US. Several movie studios pursued him and Adler was successful, signing him to a multi-picture contract with Fox. Bernardine was to be his first film.

Boone tested for the roles of both Beaumont and Sanford. He was eventually cast as Beaumont - the role played on stage by John Kerr. Dick Sargent received his first important screen role as Sanford. (Edd Byrnes reportedly also tested for the role.) Janet Gaynor was lured out of retirement to co-star as Sanford's mother.

Filming on Bernardine started February 4, 1957 and was completed on March 27, 1957.

Songs
"Bernardine"
"Love Letters in the Sand"
"Technique"

Reception
In the 21st century, TV Guide called Bernardine "... Fox's answer to the Presley films. Boone, who first achieved national recognition on Arthur Godfrey's TV show, is the white on white hero, one of several young and definitely unsleazy students who create a mythical girl named Bernardine that they would all love to love."

In 2019, Diabolique magazine, criticizing Sargent's performance in the leading role, said the filmmakers erred by not giving Boone that part instead. "This weird casting decision was presumably made so as not to burden Pat too much on his first time out. After all, in Love Me Tender, Elvis plays a supporting role to Richard Egan. Later, in Hound Dog Man (1959), Fabian would support Stuart Whitman. But those were good parts. Pat Boone’s role is lousy. The main thing he does in the movie is sing (including “Love Letters in the Sand” which became a huge hit) and introduce an elder brother (James Drury) who runs off with Terry Moore. Boone's presence even throws the movie off a little. He gets screen time his character doesn't deserve, and when he sings love songs — despite not having an on-screen love interest — it feels weird."

See also
 List of American films of 1957

References

Notes

Bibliography

 Solomon, Aubrey. Twentieth Century Fox: A Corporate and Financial History (The Scarecrow Filmmakers Series). Lanham, Maryland: Scarecrow Press, 1989. .

External links
 
 
 
 
 
Review of film at The New York Times

1957 films
1957 musical comedy films
CinemaScope films
American musical comedy films
American films based on plays
20th Century Fox films
Films directed by Henry Levin
Films scored by Lionel Newman
1950s English-language films
1950s American films